This is a list of defunct airlines of Kyrgyzstan.

See also
 List of airlines of Kyrgyzstan
 List of airports in Kyrgyzstan

References

Kyrgyzstan
Airlines
Airlines, defunct